Blake Aaron Ross (born June 12, 1985) is an American software engineer who is best known for his work as the co-creator of the Mozilla Firefox internet browser with Dave Hyatt. In 2005, he was nominated for Wired magazine's top Rave Award, Renegade of the Year, opposite Larry Page, Sergey Brin and Jon Stewart. He was also a part of Rolling Stone magazine's 2005 hot list. From 2007, he worked for Facebook as Director of Product until resigning in early 2013.

Early life and education
Born in Miami, Florida, Ross was raised in Key Biscayne, Florida to a Jewish family. His mother, Abby, is a psychologist, and his father David is a lawyer. He has an older brother and sister. Ross created his first website via America Online at the age of 10. By middle school, an interest in SimCity led him to piece together a couple of rudimentary videogames. He attended high school in Miami at Gulliver Preparatory School, graduating in 2003 while simultaneously working for Mozilla, based in California.

Mozilla and Firefox 

Ross is most well known for co-founding the Mozilla Firefox project with Dave Hyatt. Ross discovered Netscape very soon after it open-sourced and began contributing, his mother's frustrated user experience with Internet Explorer being the main driver. He worked as an intern at Netscape Communications Corporation at the age of 16.  In 2003, he enrolled at Stanford University. While interning at Netscape, Ross became disenchanted with the browser he was working on and the direction given to it by America Online, which had recently purchased Netscape. Ross and Hyatt envisioned a smaller, easy-to-use browser that could have mass appeal, and Firefox was born from that idea. The open source project gained momentum and popularity, and in 2003 all of Mozilla's resources were devoted to the Firefox and Thunderbird projects. Released in November 2004, when Ross was 19, Firefox quickly grabbed market share (primarily from Microsoft's Internet Explorer), with 100 million downloads in less than a year.

Ross is the author of Firefox For Dummies (published January 11, 2006).

Career
Ross founded a new startup with another ex-Netscape employee, Joe Hewitt (the creator of Firebug who was also largely responsible for Firefox's interface and code). Ross and Hewitt worked on creating Parakey, a new user interface designed to bridge the gap between the desktop and the web. Ross revealed several technical details about the program and his new company when featured on the cover of IEEE Spectrum in November 2006.

On July 20, 2007, the BBC reported that Facebook had purchased Parakey.

In early 2013, Ross left Facebook to pursue other interests.

In 2015, Ross wrote a spec screenplay for HBO's Silicon Valley.

Personal life 
Ross has aphantasia, a rare condition preventing him from visualizing things in his mind. In a blog post, Ross wrote:I have never visualized anything in my entire life. I can’t "see" my father's face or a bouncing blue ball, my childhood bedroom or the run I went on ten minutes ago. I thought "counting sheep" was a metaphor. I’m 30 years old and I never knew a human could do any of this.

In 2015, he wrote a fan fiction original screenplay for the HBO television comedy series Silicon Valley, which gained attention.

References

External links

Profiles
 The Firefox Explosion — Wired magazine article by Josh McHugh on Firefox development history (published February 2005)

Interviews
 Firefox ignites demand for alternative browser — interview with Byron Acohido for USA Today (published November 9, 2004)
 Interview with Firefox developer Blake Ross — interview with Michael Flaminio for Insanely Great Mac (published November 9, 2004)
 Full speed ahead: Mozilla Firefox browser blazes through globe — interview with Michelle Keller for Stanford Daily Article (published November 16, 2004)
 Firefox Architect Talks IE, Future Plans — interview with Nate Mook for BetaNews (published November 29, 2004)
 The Young Turk of Firefox — interview with Keith Ward for Redmond Magazine (published December 2004)
 Q&A With Blake Ross — interview with Computer Power User magazine (published January 2005)
 Interview — Blake Ross — interview with Non-Tech City (published May 27, 2005)
 Firefox Will Be Free Forever — interview with Xu Zhiqiang for OhmyNews (published August 7, 2005)
 The Firefox Kid — David Kushner's article on Ross and Parakey in IEEE Spectrum (published November 2, 2006)
 Livingston, Jessica, Founders at work: stories of startups' early days, 2007. Cf. Chapter 29, Blake Ross and Firefox.

1985 births
Living people
American bloggers
Web developers
American computer programmers
Facebook employees
Mozilla developers
Free software programmers
Open source people
Writers from Miami
20th-century American Jews
Gulliver Preparatory School alumni
21st-century American Jews